Paludomidae, common name paludomids, is a family of freshwater snails, gastropod molluscs in the clade Sorbeoconcha.

Distribution 
The distribution of the Paludomidae includes Asia and Africa.

Taxonomy 
The following three subfamilies have been recognized in the taxonomy of Bouchet & Rocroi (2005):

 Paludominae Stoliczka, 1868 - synonym: Philopotamidinae Stache, 1889
 Cleopatrinae Pilsbry & Bequaert, 1927
 Hauttecoeuriinae Bourguignat, 1885
 tribe Hauttecoeuriini Bourguignat, 1885 - synonym: Tanganyiciinae Bandel, 1998
 tribe Nassopsini Kesteven, 1903 - synonym: Lavigeriidae Thile, 1925
 tribe Rumellini Ancey, 1906
 tribe Spekiini Ancey, 1906 - synonyms: Giraudiidae Bourguignat, 1885 (inv.); Reymondiinae Bandel, 1998
 tribe Syrnolopsini Bourguignat, 1890
 tribe Tiphobiini Bourguignat, 1886 - synonyms: Hilacanthidae Bourguignat, 1890; Paramelaniidae J. E. S. Moore, 1898; Bathanaliidae Ancey, 1906; Limnotrochidae Ancey, 1906

A nomenclator of all Paludomidae was published in 2019.

Genera 
Genera within the family Paludomidae include:

Paludominae
 Ganga Layard, 1855
 Paludomus Swainson, 1840 - type genus of the family Paludomidae
 Philopotamis Layard, 1855

Cleopatrinae
 Cleopatra Troschel, 1857 - type genus of the subfamily Cleopatrinae
 Pseudocleopatra Thiele, 1928

Hauttecoeuriinae

tribe Hauttecoeuriini
 Tanganyicia Crosse, 1881 - synonym: Hauttecoeuria Bourguignat, 1885

tribe Nassopsini
 Lavigeria Bourguignat, 1888
 Potadomoides Leloup, 1953
 Vinundu Michel, 2004

tribe Rumellini
 Stanleya Bourguignat, 1885

tribe Spekiini
 Bridouxia Bourguignat, 1885
 Reymondia Bourguignat, 1885
 Spekia Bourguignat, 1879 - type genus of the tribe Spekiini

tribe Syrnolopsini
 Anceya Bourguignat, 1885
 Martelia Dautzenberg, 1908
 Syrnolopsis E. A. Smith, 1880 - type genus of the tribe Syrnolopsini

tribe Tiphobiini
 Bathanalia Moore, 1898
 Chytra Moore, 1898 - with the only species Chytra kirki (E. A. Smith, 1880)
 Hirthia Ancey, 1898
 Limnotrochus Smith, 1880 - with the only species Limnotrochus thomsoni Smith, 1880
 Mysorelloides Leloup, 1953 - with the only species Mysorelloides multisulcata (Bourguignat, 1888)
 Paramelania Smith, 1881
 Tiphobia E. A. Smith, 1880 - type genus of the tribe Tiphobiini, with the only species Tiphobia horei E. A. Smith, 1880

Synonyms
 Hemimitra Swainson, 1840: synonym of Paludomus Swainson, 1840 (junior synonym)
 Heteropoma Benson, 1856: synonym of Philopotamis Layard, 1855 (objective synonym)
 Odontochasma Tomlin, 1930: synonym of Paludomus (Odontochasma) Tomlin, 1930 represented as Paludomus Swainson, 1840
 Stomatodon Benson, 1862: synonym of Odontochasma Tomlin, 1930: synonym of Paludomus (Odontochasma) Tomlin, 1930 represented as Paludomus Swainson, 1840 (unavailable; a junior homonym of Stomatodon Seeley, 1861 [Gastropoda, Ringiculidae])
 Cambieria Bourguignat, 1885: synonym of Tanganyicia Crosse, 1881 
 Hauttecoeuria Bourguignat, 1885: synonym of Tanganyicia Crosse, 1881 
 Tanganikia Bourguignat, 1885: synonym of Tanganyicia Crosse, 1881
 Edgaria Bourguignat, 1888: synonym of Lavigeria Bourguignat, 1888 
 Nassopsis E. A. Smith, 1890 - type genus of the tribe Nassopsini: synonym of Lavigeria Bourguignat, 1888 
 Randabelia Bourguignat, 1888: synonym of Lavigeria Bourguignat, 1888
 Rumella Bourguignat, 1885 - type genus of the tribe Rumellini: synonym of Stanleya Bourguignat, 1885 (junior synonym)
 Baizea Bourguignat, 1885: synonym of Bridouxia Bourguignat, 1885
 Coulboisia Bourguignat, 1888: synonym of Bridouxia Bourguignat, 1885
 Giraudia Bourguignat, 1885: synonym of Bridouxia Bourguignat, 1885 (junior homonym of Giraudia Foerster, 1868 [Hymenoptera])
 Lechaptoisia Ancey, 1894: synonym of Bridouxia Bourguignat, 1885 (replacement name for Horea E. A. Smith, 1889 nec Bourguignat, 1888)
 Stormsia Bourguignat, 1891: synonym of Syrnolopsis E. A. Smith, 1880
 Burtonilla E. A. Smith, 1904: synonym of Anceya Bourguignat, 1885
 Bourguignatia Giraud, 1885: synonym of Paramelania E. A. Smith, 1881 (invalid: junior homonym of Bourguignatia Brusina, 1884)
 Bythoceras Moore, 1898: synonym of Paramelania E. A. Smith, 1881 (junior synonym)
 Hilacantha Ancey, 1886: synonym of Tiphobia E. A. Smith, 1880 (invalid: Unnecessary nom. nov. pro Tiphobia Smith, 1880

References

Further reading 
 Glaubrecht M. & Strong E. E. (September 2004) "Spermatophores of thalassoid gastropods (Paludomidae) in Lake Tanganyika, East Africa, with a survey of their occurrence in Cerithioidea: functional and phylogenetic implications". Invertebrate Biology 123(3): 218-236.

External links